Rocketball is a sports-action Commodore 64 computer game released by IJK Software in 1985. Rocketball was coded by John Sinclair and has music by L Pilling. Rocketball is based on the futuristic sports movie Rollerball, released in 1975, starring James Caan.  Rocketball'''s taglines were, "The rules are, there are no rules", and "This was never meant to be a game."

GameplayRocketball is set in the year 2010 AD, where worldwide disputes are no longer settled through wars, but through a circular Rocket Ball arena.

The game is similar to Roller Derby in that two teams on roller skates travel counter-clockwise around a banked, circular track. The object of the game is to score points by throwing a softball-sized metal ball into a cone-shaped goal target inset into the wall of the arena. Balls are fired into play, in the same direction players skate, by cannons when play begins and to restart play after the ball rolls out of play or a goal is scored. Players can use fists, elbows and knees to disable their opponents.

Each Rocketball team has five active players on roller skates. Unlike the film, there are no players riding motorcycles. The four Rocketball teams are Houston (wearing blue), Tokyo (yellow), Moscow (burgundy) and Madrid (Green), which correspond to futuristic city states. (The teams Houston, Tokyo and Madrid also featured in the Rollerball film.)

Games have a duration of ten minutes. 

PackagingRocketball came in a Single Cassette Case. It boasted super-smooth scrolling, being written in 100% machine code, and a shadow on the ball.

See alsoKillerball''

References

1985 video games
Commodore 64 games
Commodore 64-only games
Fantasy sports video games 
Roller derby mass media
Video games set in 2010
Alternate history video games
Video games developed in the United Kingdom